The Hamilton Spectator is a tri-weekly tabloid newspaper, which has been published in Hamilton, Victoria, Australia since 1859. It is published by the Hamilton Spectator Partnership Pty Ltd. Originally, the Spectator was known as the Hamilton Courier as established in 1859 by Thomas Wotton Shevill, it then became the Hamilton Spectator and Grange District Advertiser in 1860, and later The Hamilton Spectator.

Timeline

1850s - 1890s
 23 July 1859 - The first issue of the 'Hamilton Courier and Normanby, Dundas, Follet and Villiers and Heytesbury Advertiser'. Run by Thomas Shevill, who came to Hamilton from Warrnambool. He narrowly beat a rival group which had been preparing to start a paper but had run into difficulties. Once the Courier was started, the other project lapsed for the time being.
 11 February 1860 - George Robinson (1824–96) who had been intending to start a paper before the 'Courier' began, bought the copyright of the Courier from T.W. Shevill. 'The Courier' became 'The Spectator'. Spectator was published each Saturday.
 1861 - The Spectator faced short-lived competition from a periodical 'Punch in Hamilton'. It was run by Joseph Wilson as his way of making barbed and witty comments on local affairs.
 December 1861 - Spectator proprietor Robinson took in his first partner, William Vale.
 April 1862 – The Spectator faced serious challenge from the ‘Hamilton Free Press’. It followed the floating of the Hamilton joint stock newspaper company in June 1861 with capital of 600 pounds in one pound shares.
 1862-1869 – Good relationship between The Spectator and Free Press, no sparring.
 1864 – Vale took over the entire running of the Spectator when Robinson went to Europe. Robinson left money in Vale's trust. Vale made unexpected use of the money and the matter ended in court. A bailiff auctioned the paper's copyright outside the Spectator office, returning the ownership to Robinson.
 June 1864 – A Wednesday issue also began appearing.
 1866 – Robinson took in Francis H. Nixon (died 1883) as his partner. Under their partnership, paper was generally perceptive and far seeing. It tried to be politically neutral, yet expressed strong opinions on important issues. Its views were generally liberal.
 1869 – Opposition from the 'Hamilton Free Press' ended when the Free Press closed.
 1869-70 – Robinson took in new partner and editor, George H. Mott (1832-1906), formerly the proprietor of ‘Albury Border Post’. Mott built first part of historic home, 'Kilora'. Under his editorship, the Spectator turned strongly against protection and became a supporter of free trade. The paper also became a mouthpiece for Mott's conservative politics.
 Early 1870s – Views of Spectator swung towards support for conservative politics.
 1873 – Opening of the new 'Spectator' next to the Post Office.
 January 1876 – A new, short-lived rival for the Spectator 'The Commercial' began. It closed in March the same year.
 1876 – Robinson sold his share in the paper to George R. Rippon (1838–99) who shared Mott's conservatism.
 October 1876 – Spectator increased to three issues, Tuesday, Thursday and Saturday.
 1885 – G.H. Mott sold his share in partnership to G.R. Rippon, who became sole proprietor. The world in which Rippon moved was a large homestead, the Hamilton Club and prosperous businessmen. His editors tended to reflect that world and its conservative politics.
 1890 – Another newspaper to rival the Spectator, 'The Hamilton Tribune and Western Farmer Record' began. It published three times a week on alternate days to the Spectator. At the time of the Tribune's challenge, the Spectator was edited by W.T. Reay who had some pretensions to liberalism, so was able to soften the attitude of the Spectator. He went on to become editor of the Melbourne Herald.
 1890-93 – Editors of Spectator and Tribune not always the best of friends. Tribune called Spec "the old Gray lady in Gray St".
 September 1891 – Rippon took Tribune to court for plagiarism. Case failed on technical objection to legal status of Spectator copyright.
 1892 – Spectator declared itself liberal, rather than conservative as it always had been.
 September 1893 – The Tribune unable to cope due to the long depression, closed.
 1897-1913 – Editor P.A. (Phil) Gullett. Spectator staunchly anti-Labor.
 April 1899 – G.R. Rippon died. Paper continued under management of his son, Herbert E. Rippon.

1900s - 1990s
 1903 – New opponent for the Spectator, the 'Hamilton Independent' began, publishing three days a week on alternate days to the Spectator.
 Circa 1904 – Under competition, The Spectator was forced to drop its price to a penny in line with Independent.
 1908 – Spectator began to publish daily.
 November 1910 – Under increased competition from the Spectator, now publishing daily, the Tribune closes in November 1910.
 1915-1936 – Editor Henry W. Dew expressed conservative politics.
 1917 – Spectator ceased publishing daily and went back to three days a week. Reason was a paper shortage, a side-effect of World War I. Price increased from Id to 2d.
 1937 – R.C. Foyster became editor of the Spectator. Editorial view became more neutral.
 Circa 1954 – George Reynolds Rippon the younger takes over after his father's death.
 January 1968 – The Spectator Partnership incorporates the Portland Observer.
 May 1976 – The Spectator and its associated publications changed from molten metal production to offset production involving a new press and advanced technology. The first offset edition marked an enormous equipment upgrading and extension worth more than $1 million during the next decade.
 1978 – The Spectator establishes an employee participation scheme, transferring 15% of the company's capital to staff, according to years served.
 Early 1980s – The Spectator commissioned its first computerised typesetting system.
 October 1981 – The Spectator partners bought ‘The Western Advertiser’ based at Portland and returned it to its original town, Casterton, and returned the paper to its former name, "Casterton News".
 1985 – Beks Holdings Pty Ltd gains a controlling interest in the company and The Spectator reiterates a politically neutral course.
 1986 – Publisher Richard Beks becomes the company's only state president of the Victorian newspaper association.
 1987 – The Spectator launches two specialty papers, Western District Farmer and Western District Holiday News, which are syndicated as supplements within newspapers circulating in Western Victoria.
 April 1994 – The Spectator appointed its first female editor, Jan Leishman, who served in that position until 2005.
 12 April 1995 – First in-house computerised colour separation and combining at the Hamilton Spectator.
 13 May 1995 – First full colour front page on the Spectator.
 1996 – Installed computers and software to produce digital images that enabled the Spectator to use regular full colour. The company opens a fourth office in Warrnambool.
 1997 – Spectator offices go fully online and become internet service providers.
 1998 – Electronic pagination. The Spectator installed an image setter to take fully paginated pages direct to negative film, rather than printing from a quality laser printer.
 June 1999 – New 38 cm format and redesign.
 1999 – The Spectator Partnership launches its website, plus a virtual used car yard servicing the Green Triangle region of Western Victoria and the south-east of South Australia.
 2006/8 – In a multimillion-dollar upgrade The Spectator printer equipment is remodelled, two full colour printing units imported from China are commissioned, along with ancillary digital plate-makers and software sourced in Europe.
 2009 – The Spectator marks its 150th anniversary.
 2011 - The Spectator launches its highly anticipated new website, encompassing over 10 years of archives.

Coverage
The newspaper is published Tuesday, Thursday and Saturday.

The Hamilton Spectator covers many towns including - Ararat, Branxholme, Balmoral, Byaduk, Caramut, Casterton, Cavendish, Chetwynd, Coleraine, Condah, Dartmoor, Digby, Dunkeld. Edenhope, Glenthompson, Hamilton, Harrow, Hawkesdale, Heywood, Horsham, Koroit, Lake Bolac, Macarthur, Merino, Millicent, Mortlake, Mount Gambier, Narrawong, Penshurst, Port Fairy, Portland, Stawell, Tyrendarra, Warrnambool, Westmere, Willaura, Winnap and Yambuk.

References

External links 
 Hamilton Spectator (www.spec.com.au)
 
 Digitised World War I Victorian newspapers from the State Library of Victoria

Newspapers published in Victoria (Australia)
Hamilton, Victoria
Newspapers on Trove